= Journal of Special Education =

- Discipline: Education, Special Education
- Language: English
- Edited by: Bob Algozzine and Fred Spooner

Publication details
- History: 1966-present
- Publisher: SAGE Publications
- Frequency: Quarterly
- Impact factor: 2.262 (2017)

Standard abbreviations
- ISO 4: J. Spec. Educ.

Indexing
- ISSN: 0022-4669 (print); 1538-4764 (web)
- LCCN: 66009979
- OCLC no.: 1783202

Links
- Journal homepage; Online access; Online archive

Journal of Special Education is a peer-reviewed academic journal that publishes papers in the field of Education. The journal's editors are Bob Algozzine (University of North Carolina at Charlotte) and Fred Spooner (University of North Carolina at Charlotte). It has been in publication since 1966 and is currently published by SAGE Publications in association with Hammil Institute on Disabilities.

== Scope ==
Journal of Special Education publishes research articles and scholarly reviews on special education for individuals with mild to severe disabilities. The journal features traditional, ethnographic and single-subject research as well as intervention studies, reviews on timely issues and critical commentaries.

== Abstracting and indexing ==
Journal of Special Education is abstracted and indexed in, among other databases, SCOPUS and the Social Sciences Citation Index. According to the Journal Citation Reports, its 2017 impact factor is 2.262, ranking it 4 out of 40 journals in the category ‘Education, Special’.
